MARC Cars Australia is an Australian motor racing manufacturer and team, who compete in global sports car and endurance racing events, mostly in their own GTC prototype cars.

Racing history

Production
Founder Ryan McLeod entered several editions of the Bathurst 12 Hour under the team's former name, Racer Industries. After an initial foray in 2009 with father Peter and brother Gerard, the family entry, driving a Holden Astra SRi returned in 2010 to win its class. In the years following, the team moved away from a family focus, instead providing opportunities to various young drivers including Chaz Mostert, Scott Pye and Ashley Walsh in a HSV VXR Turbo. The team won further class victories in 2012, in which the team finished seventh overall, and in 2013.

GTC
In 2013, an initial GTC prototype was built and tested by Pace Innovations, following their work on new chassis for the Supercars Championship and V8SuperTourer series. The initial model, styled as a Ford Focus, featured a five-litre Ford Coyote V8 engine and was tested at Queensland Raceway by Glenn Seton and Russell Ingall amongst others. After an initial plan to run the cars in South Africa, Racer Industries developed a package based on the GTC prototype and entered three cars, now each branded as a MARC, in the Invitational class of the 2014 Liqui Moly Bathurst 12 Hour.

McLeod used the event as a launching pad for developing and promoting a package that could compete in global endurance races on a reduced budget. The team, or its cars, have since competed in the Silverstone 24 Hours, Dubai 24 Hour and Sepang 12 Hours amongst others. In 2015, the team competed in the full season of the 24H Series, consisting of six 12 or 24 hour races globally. Since then, VDS Racing Adventures have used MARC cars in the series. In 2015, MARC also unveiled a Mazda3-styled body panel kit to enter the 2015 Liqui Moly Bathurst 12 Hour, which still used the Ford Coyote engine.

In 2014, MARC Cars were given their own class in the National Sports Sedan Series, while they are also eligible for the Australian GT Trophy Series as of 2016. With the Invitational class at the Bathurst 12 Hour predominantly made up of MARC entries, the team has won four consecutive class victories with the GTC prototypes, which extends to six when taking into account their HSV victories.

In 2017, MARC Cars competed in the United States for the first time, with entries in the California 8 Hours at Mazda Raceway Laguna Seca and the 24H COTA at the Circuit of the Americas.

II V8

Ahead of the 2018 Liqui Moly Bathurst 12 Hour, MARC Cars Australia launched the MARC II V8, their second generation GTC racer unofficially styled on the Ford Mustang. Their three entries in the Bathurst 12 Hour were allowed to lap in the 2:06s bracket, having previously been restricted to 2:10s. With MARC Cars making up seven of the nine entries in the Invitational class, the manufacturer picked up another class victory, with the sole remaining MARC II V8 finishing ahead of the first generation MARC entries.

GT3 and GT4
In 2016, MARC Cars acquired a BMW M6 GT3 and entered it in selected rounds of the 2016 Australian GT Championship, including hiring factory BMW driver Bruno Spengler to drive with regular driver Morgan Haber at the Phillip Island round. The team also entered their M6 GT3, as well as a record six GTC entries, at the 2017 Liqui Moly Bathurst 12 Hour with Chaz Mostert as lead driver. Mostert qualified second on the grid, however the car did not finish the race after suffering a Gearbox failure. From the 2018 Bathurst 12 Hour, MARC Cars prepared a BMW M4 GT4 for American entry RHC-Lawrence/Strom.

Company history
In 2020, GJ Motorsport, run by Geoff Taunton and a former customer team using MARC's prototypes, purchased the company from Ryan McLeod.

References

Australian racecar constructors
Australian auto racing teams
Automotive motorsports and performance companies
2013 establishments in Australia